Trad Jazz is an Australian television series which aired in 1962 on ATN-7 in Sydney, HSV-7 in Melbourne, and possibly other stations (note: this was before the "official" creation of the Seven Network). Hosted by Graeme Bell, it was a music series with trad jazz music. In 1963, it aired for an additional season as Just Jazz, with the format expanded to include other kinds of jazz music.

It was a half-hour series.

Previously, Graeme Bell had hosted The Graeme Bell Show for ABC during 1958.

Despite having aired during an era where wiping of music shows was common, four episodes are held by National Film and Sound Archive.

See also
Other jazz music TV series included:
Look Who's Dropped In
Sweet and Low
Australian All Star Jazz Band
Jazz Meets Folk

References

External links
Trad Jazz on IMDb

1962 Australian television series debuts
1963 Australian television series endings
Black-and-white Australian television shows
Australian music television series
English-language television shows
Seven Network original programming